Twatt is a settlement in the parish of Birsay on the Mainland of the Orkney Islands, Scotland. It was previously the location of RNAS Twatt (HMS Tern),1940–1949. Twatt is situated at the junction of the A986 and the A967.

Etymology

The settlement name originates from the Old Norse þveit, meaning 'small parcel of land'. The Norse word commonly produces in England the place name element Thwaite.

The name Twatt is similar to the common English expletive "twat", an insult used to express contempt or derision for a person. The village's name featured at number four in a list of the most vulgar-sounding names in Rude Britain, along with its Shetland counterpart.  There is also an Upper Twatt Road on the island in Stenness.

Local services
A post office opened at Twatt on 1 November 1879.  It closed on 10 April 2002.

References

External links

Buildings at Risk - Control Tower, Twatt Aerodrome

Villages on Mainland, Orkney